Canichana, or Canesi, Joaquiniano, is a possible language isolate of Bolivia (department of Beni). In 1991 there were 500 Canichana people, but only 20 spoke the Canichana language; by 2000 the ethnic population was 583, but the language had no L1 speakers left.

It was spoken on the Mamoré River and Machupo River.

Language contact
Jolkesky (2016) notes that there are lexical similarities with the Mochica language due to contact.

Vocabulary
Loukotka (1968) lists the following basic vocabulary items for Canichana.

{| class="wikitable sortable"
! gloss !! Canichana
|-
| one || mereka
|-
| two || kadita
|-
| three || kaʔarxata
|-
| tooth || eu-kuti
|-
| tongue || au-cháva
|-
| hand || eu-tixle
|-
| woman || ikegahui
|-
| water || nese
|-
| fire || nichuku
|-
| moon || nimilaku
|-
| maize || ni-chuxú
|-
| jaguar || ni-xolani
|-
| house || ni-tikoxle
|}

See also
Llanos de Moxos (archaeology)

References

Alain Fabre, 2005, Diccionario etnolingüístico y guía bibliográfica de los pueblos indígenas sudamericanos: KANICHANA.
de Créqui-Montfort, G.; Rivet, P. (1913). Linguistique Bolivienne: La Langue Kaničana. Mémoires de la Société de Linguistique de Paris, 18:354-377.

External links

  La Langue Kaničana
 Lenguas de Bolivia (online edition)
Canichana transcriptions of GlobalRecordings audio files

Languages of Bolivia
Language isolates of South America